Too Much Trouble (often abbreviated to "TMT") is an American gangsta rap group from Houston, Texas. The group produced three albums before disbanding in 1997.

Members
Drunk D 
Bar-None (John Vanbibber)
DJ Bad News Black (Tracy Howze)
Ghetto MC

Discography

References

Southern hip hop groups
Rappers from Houston
Musical groups from Houston
Gangsta rap groups